The Minister for Culture of Denmark is the Danish political minister office responsible for culture, head of the Ministry of Culture of Denmark.

The political responsibility for culture, as well as church and education, was with the Kultus Minister from 1848 to 1916 when that post was split up into the posts of Education Minister and Church Minister. From 1916 the Church Minister had political responsibility for culture, until the post of Minister for Culture was created in 1961.

The office was titled Minister for Cultural Affairs ("Minister for kulturelle anliggender") from 1961 to 1988, Culture and Communications Minister ("Kultur- og kommunikationsminister") from 1986 to 1988, and Minister for Culture ("Kulturminister") from 1988 to the present.

List of Ministers for Culture

References
List of Culture Ministers – From the Danish Ministry of Culture.

Lists of government ministers of Denmark
Government ministerial offices of Denmark